Get Out and Walk is the debut album by the Farmer's Boys, released in 1983. Initial copies came with a free 33.3rpm 12" with 12" versions of "For You", "Muck It Out", "Probably One of the Best Investments I Ever Made" and "Soft Drink". The album reached No. 49 on the UK Albums Chart.

Track listing
 "Matter of Fact"
 "Probably One of the Best Investments I Ever Made"
 "More Than a Dream"
 "Woke Up This Morning"
 "The Way You Made Me Cry"
 "A Promise You Can't Keep"
 "Soft Drink"
 "Wailing Wall"
 "For You"
 "Torn in Two"
 "Who Needs It"

References

1983 debut albums
EMI Records albums
The Farmer's Boys albums